Juan Anthony Edghill (born 25 December 1964) is a Guyanese pastor and politician. He is the founder and presiding bishop of Zadok Ministers Fellowship. Edghill is also the current Guyanese Minister of Public Works in Guyana.

Biography 
Edghill was born in Georgetown on 25 December 1964. He attended Hauraruni Full Gospel Missionary Training Center in 1983 and obtained a Diploma in Theology in 1986.

Career 
Between 2003 and 2011, Edghill was the Chairman of Ethnic Relations Commission (ERC) in Guyana. In 2013, Edghill became a parliamentarian in Guyana and was subsequently appointed Minister in August 2020 by President Irfaan Ali. He's a member of the People's Progressive Party.

References 

Living people
1964 births
People from Georgetown, Guyana
Government ministers of Guyana
People's Progressive Party (Guyana) politicians
South American political people